Pa'O may refer to:

 Pa'O language, a Karen language of Burma
 Pa'O people, an ethnic nationality in Burma